Here are the Olympiacos F.C. seasons which represent the period from 1959 until now, because that was the first year of National League system.

Seasons

Overall seasons table

External links
Hellenic Football Federation 
Rec.Sport.Soccer Statistics Foundation

 
Olympiacos